Runa Islam (born 10 December 1970) is a Bangladeshi-born British visual artist and filmmaker based in London. She was a nominee for the 2008 Turner Prize. She is principally known for her film works.

Early life
Islam was born in Dhaka, Bangladesh and moved to London aged three. She attended the Rijksakademie van Beeldende Kunsten, Amsterdam, from 1997 to 1998.

In 1999, Islam exhibited at EASTinternational which was selected by Peter Doig and Roy Arden. She completed a M.Phil at the Royal College of Art, London, in 2004.

Career
Islam has been inspired by European auteurs such as Jean-Luc Godard.

In 2005, she participated in the Venice Biennale. Islam's 2006 16mm film installation Conditional Probability was the result of a residency at North Westminster Community School, in the final year before its closure. It was first exhibited at the Serpentine Gallery and was said to "imbue even the most mundane dusty corner with a little visual magic". The other artists included in the project to document the life of the school before it closed were Christian Boltanski, Faisal Abdu'allah and the architect Yona Friedman.

In 2010, the Museum of Contemporary Art, Sydney (MCA) presented Runa Islam's first solo exhibition in Australia.  Works included Magical Consciousness (2010), co-commissioned by the MCA and the Musée d'art contemporain de Montréal (MACM) and Scale (1/16 Inch = 1 Foot) featuring the now demolished Trinity Square (Gateshead) multi-storey car park.

Islam says, "I feel I've got a lot to say with film. The camera can go to impossible places. It can re-articulate time. Films from other epochs allow you to go back in time. But so much of contemporary life is also envisioned through film and TV. We remember people we've never met because we've seen them on a screen."

Awards and nominations
In 2008, Islam was nominated for the 2008 Turner Prize.

See also
 British Bangladeshi
 List of British Bangladeshis

References

External links
Turner Prize 2008 on Tate web site
Runa Islam: Private View 
A review of Conditional Probability followed by a brief interview about the work in Time Out magazine.
Life in Film
Islam chooses films and film moments that have inspired her for Frieze.
SHUGOARTS
A page with a number of photographs of Islam's work and stills from her films.
Telegraph slideshow
Series of stills from Islam's work Conditional Probability

Interviews
Runa Islam Interview; Göteborg International biennial 2005
Interview with particular regard to the works:
Time Lines
First Day of Spring
Answers to Questions: Runa Islam in conversation with Tine Fischer
Islam talks extensively about her film work.

Reviews
Runa Islam, White Cube, London
Review of exhibition from The Daily Telegraph
The Telegraph review by Alastair Sooke
Review of Islam's work Conditional Probability.
Frieze review
Review of Empty the pond to get to the fish from Frieze
Frieze review – Camden Arts Centre
Review of exhibition featuring the works:
How Far To Faro
The First Day of Spring

1970 births
Living people
British Muslims
Bangladeshi emigrants to England
Artists from London
British women artists
People from Dhaka
Alumni of the Royal College of Art
English contemporary artists